Santa Margherita is a deconsecrated church in Venice, Italy.
It currently houses the Auditorium Santa Margherita, one of the buildings of the Ca' Foscari University of Venice.

Roman Catholic churches in Venice